The Rochester Museum of Fine Arts (RMFA) is an all-volunteer, community art initiative dedicated to the accessibility of contemporary works made by regionally, nationally, and internationally recognized artists. Founded in 2011, the RMFA works to enrich people’s lives through the presentation of fine art. The permanent collection and other rotating exhibitions are prominently displayed in the halls and Suite 135 of the James W. Foley Memorial Community Center and Rochester Public Library.

Galleries
The permanent collection contains more than 200 donated, multidisciplinary works that represent an ever-evolving range of visual expression, including painting, sculpture, printmaking, drawing, photography, film, and more. The Mayor Harvey E. Bernier Room and Andrew Carnegie Gallery feature temporary art exhibits, made by emerging and seasoned artists. The Pixel Room showcases extraordinary and thought-provoking digital works on a 4K UHD LED display.

Exhibitions
Notable past exhibitions featured Susan Kare, graphic designer responsible for many of the interface elements and typefaces for the original Apple Macintosh; Eric Carle, author and illustrator of The Very Hungry Caterpillar, a picture book that has been translated into more than 65 languages and sold more than 46 million copies; Wayne White, painter, puppeteer, set designer for Pee Wee’s Playhouse; Robert Indiana, creator of the iconic LOVE statue and stamp; Bob Gruen, famous rock ’n roll photographer for John Lennon, Led Zeppelin, Sex Pistols, and many more; Sunday B. Morning, the screen printing company behind Andy Warhol’s second Marilyn Monroe series; and the Picasso Estate Collection, a selection of original lithographs qualified by Picasso’s granddaughter, Marina Picasso.

References

External links
Rochester Museum of Fine Arts official website

Museums of American art
Art museums established in 2012
Art museums and galleries in New Hampshire
2012 establishments in New Hampshire
Rochester, New Hampshire
Museums in Strafford County, New Hampshire